Laviolette can refer to:

Places 
 Laviolette Bridge, linking Trois-Rivières and Bécancour via Autoroute 55 in Quebec, Canada
 Laviolette (electoral district), a provincial electoral district in Quebec, Canada
Asteroid 21550 Laviolette

People 
 Jack Laviolette (1879–1960), former National Hockey League player
 Jacqueline Laviolette, member of American pop group, Girl Authority
 Marc Laviolette, former mayor of Ottawa, Ontario
 Peter Laviolette (born 1964), an American former professional ice hockey defenseman and current head coach of the Nashville Predators
 Sieur de Laviolette (fl. 1634–36), the first commandant of Trois-Rivières, Quebec